D.D.E. is a Norwegian pop/rock group founded in Namsos in 1992. The members were previously in a band called After Dark.

Biography 
D.D.E. is a Norwegian pop/rock band that was formed in the small town of Namsos in 1992.

D.D.E.'s music is heavily influenced by traditional Norwegian folk music and rock, resulting in a unique sound that has garnered a dedicated following in Norway. The band has released over 15 albums since their debut in 1992, with their most popular songs including "E6", "Rai Rai" and "Det går likar no".

D.D.E. has won several awards throughout their career, including the Spellemannprisen (Norwegian Grammy) for best group in 1998 and 2000, and they have also been nominated for the award numerous times. The band has also been recognized for their contributions to Norwegian culture and music, and in 2016 they were awarded the prestigious King's Medal of Merit.

D.D.E. continues to tour and perform throughout Norway, and their music remains popular with audiences of all ages. With over three decades of experience in the music industry, D.D.E. has solidified their place as one of Norway's most beloved bands.

Band members

Current members
Bjarne Brøndbo - Lead vocals, accordion (1992–present)
Daniel Viken - Guitar, backing vocals (2018–present)
Arnt Egil Rånes - Guitar, backing vocals (1992–present)
Eivind Berre - Bass, backing vocals (1992–present)
Bård Jørgen Iversen - Keyboards, accordion, backing vocals (1992–present)
Eskil Brøndbo - Drums, percussion (1992–present)

Former members
Terje Tranaas - Keyboards, accordion, backing vocals (1992–2002)
Frode Viken - Guitar, mandolin, backing vocals (1992-2018; died 2018)
Referance :

Discography

Studio Albums 

 Rai-Rai - 1993
 Rai 2 - 1994
 Det E D.D.E. - 1995
 Det Går Likar No - 1996
 Ohwææææh!!! - 1998
 No E D.D.E. Jul Igjen! - 1999
 Jippi - 2000
 Vi Ska Fæst - Aill' Mot Aill' - 2001
 Vi e konga - 2003
 Næ næ næ næ næ næ - 2005
 No Går Det Så Det Suse - 2008
 Frelsesarmeens Juleplate - 2008
 Ut av kotroll - med sola i auan - 2009
 Energi - 2012

Live Albums 

 15 år (Live) - 2007
 By'n vi bor i - all de fine sangan - 2014 (Seperate deluxe edition released)

Singles & Ep's 

 Lykka Kjem Itj Rækans På Ei Fjøl - 2005
 No Går Det Så Det Suse' - 2007
 Du Vekke Dyret . 2007
 Energi - 2012
 Æ va aldri der - 2012
 Ingen verdens ting - 2012
 Damer i solnedgangen - 2014
 Sleike sine sår - 2015
 Nabo'n min - 2017
 La det gro - 2019
 TATTA TE TU - 2019
 SÅ MANGE MIL, SÅ MANGE ÅR - 2021

Compilations 
 (2002).
 (2004)

References

Norwegian musical groups
1992 establishments in Norway
Musical groups established in 1992
Musicians from Namsos